Lac de Malpas is a lake at Malpas in the Doubs department of France.

External links
Lac et Tourbières de Malpas, les Prés-Partot et le Bief Belin 

Malpas